The 2011 FIA GT1 Beijing round was an auto racing event held at the Goldenport Park Circuit, Beijing, China on 8–10 September, and was the ninth round of the 2011 FIA GT1 World Championship season. It was the FIA GT1 World Championship's second race held in China, a week after the Ordos round as well as at the  Goldenport Park. This was a stand-alone event with no support races.

Background

Ordos Championship Race winner Frédéric Makowiecki was at the 6 Hours of Silverstone and was replaced by Bertrand Baguette who had previously raced for Marc VDS in 2011 at the Navarra round. Jonathan Hirschi replaced Vanina Ickx in the No. 9 Belgian Racing Ford GT alongside regular Christoffer Nygaard. Nico Verdonck returns to Exim Bank Team China replacing Sérgio Jimenez in the No. 12 car. Like Baguette, he had previously raced for the Chinese team at Navarra behind the wheel of the No. 11 car.

Michael Krumm and Lucas Luhr went into this weekend as championship leaders in the Drivers Championship, twelve points ahead of All-Inkl drivers Marc Basseng and Markus Winkelhock. In the Teams Championship, JR Motorsport] remained on top with a five-point lead over second place Hexis AMR and All-Inkl.com another three points behind Hexis.

Qualifying

Qualifying result
For qualifying, Driver 1 participates in the first and third sessions while Driver 2 participates in only the second session.  The fastest lap for each session is indicated with bold.

Races

Qualifying Race

Race result

Championship Race

Race result

References

External links
 Beijing GT1 Race in China – FIA GT1 World Championship

Beijing
FIA GT1 Beijing